Thomas Allen (1710–1754) was Vicar of Maughold and an author of Manx carvals.

Life
Thomas Allen was born in 1710, the son of Henry Allen and Jane Allen (née Stevenson). He was curate of Andreas from 1739 to 1746, during which time he married Mary Lace, of Ballavarry, Andreas.

After his father's death, Allen moved to take up the vicarage at Maughold on 2 June 1746. Thomas was the last in the line of five successive sons to hold the position of Vicar of Maughold Parish: Thomas (1625 to 1660), Robert (1660 to 1666), Thomas (1666 to 1727), Henry (1727 to 1748).

Allen served at Maughold until his death in 1754 at the age of 44. Like his ancestors before him, he was buried in the Maughold churchyard, on 6 August 1754. He left behind him a large personal estate worth £270. To his 11-year-old son, also named Thomas, he left his silver buckles, his gun, his mare and follower, and £5 upon reaching the age of 21 (in addition to property). He also had one daughter, Alice, who would live until the age of 72, dying in 1811.

Carvals
Allen is best remembered today for writing some of the earliest remaining examples of Manx carvals. Carvals (a corruption of the English “carol”) are long rhyming poems to be sung, originally confined to the theme of the nativity, but subsequently developing into other Christian themes. They were sung at the popular "Oiel Verrey" service, a description of which is given in The Folklore of the Isle of Man by A.W. Moore:

After the prayers were read, and a hymn was sung, the parson usually went home, leaving the Clerk in charge. Then each one who had a carol to sing would do so in turn, so that the proceedings were continued till a very late hour, and sometimes, also, unfortunately became of a rather riotous character, as it was a custom for the female part of the congregation to provide themselves with peas, which they flung at their bachelor friends. On the way home, a considerable proportion of the congregation would probably visit the nearest inn, where they would partake of the traditional drink on such occasions, viz., Hot ale, flavoured with spice, ginger, and pepper.

Lacking any other substantial body of writing in Manx, carvals have been identified as the sole source of original Manx literature prior to the late 19th Century. Allen is therefore considered an important Manx writer, having had his two extant pieces published in the first publication of Manx carvals, Carvalyn Gailckagh (or 'Manx Carols'), in 1891. Allen's carvals were entitled 'Tra Ta Mish Jeaghyn Er Yn Yrid Heose' ('A Hymn on Man's Shameful Fall'), written in 1728 and comprising 47 verses; and 'Trog Seose, My Chree' ('Rise Up, My Heart'), written in 1739 and consisting of 31 verses. Extracts of them are as follows:

References

18th-century Manx writers
Manx poets
Manx culture
Manx literature
Manx-language poets
Manx language
Manx language activists
1710 births
1754 deaths